Feyenoord Basketball, for sponsorship reasons known as Zeeuw & Zeeuw Feyenoord Basketball, is a Dutch professional basketball club based in Rotterdam. The team plays in the BNXT League and plays its home games at the Topsportcentrum next to De Kuip in Rotterdam. Established in 1954, it became the basketball section of the football club Feyenoord in 2018.

Rotterdam won their only trophy in 1985, when they won the domestic NBB Cup. The team has reached the semi-finals of the Dutch League playoffs three times in history. Until its name change to Feyenoord in 2018, the club was known as Rotterdam Basketbal.

History 

Challenge Sports Rotterdam started in 1954 under the name AMVJ Rotterdam. The first sponsor of the club was Gunco in 1988, which was their first year in the highest Dutch league. They only lasted a year and demoted to a lower division. In 1991 they returned with sponsor De Schiestreek, followed by the Rotterdam firm Idetrading in 1995. After a sponsorless year, Gunco then again returned as title sponsor in 1999. Johan Haga has made possible following a restart. This created a new name, new look, new logo and a change in the player selection. In 2002, the team took the name Rotterdam Basketbal, without sponsorname. In 2007 the team was renamed to Rotterdam Challengers, but in 2010 they again took the name Rotterdam Basketbal. Starting with the 2011–2012 season, the name became Rotterdam Basketbal College, to underline the importance of the youth in the team. During the 2013–14 season, the club got a new main sponsor in Challenge Sports and the team's name was changed to Challenge Sports Rotterdam.

In May 2018, Rotterdam reached the DBL semi-finals for the first time in 12 years, after upsetting Den Bosch in the quarter-finals, 1–2. This month the club announced as well that it would be named Feyenoord Basketball starting with the 2018–19 season, as the team became a part of the multi-sports club of association football club Feyenoord.

On 15 April 2019, accomplished head coach Toon van Helfteren signed a two-year contract to become the head coach of Feyenoord.

Since the 2021–22 season, Feyenoord plays in the BNXT League, in which the national leagues of Belgium and the Netherlands have been merged.

Names
Due to sponsorship reasons, the club has known several names:
1988–1989: Gunco Rotterdam
1989-1995: De Schiestreek Rotterdam
1995–1999: Idétrading Rotterdam
1999–2002: Gunco Rotterdam
2002–2007: Rotterdam Basketbal
2007–2010: Rotterdam Challengers
2010–2011: Rotterdam Basketbal
2011–2014: Rotterdam Basketbal College
2014–2016: Challenge Sports Rotterdam
2016–2018: Forward Lease Rotterdam
2018–present: Feyenoord Basketball
2019–present: Zeeuw & Zeeuw Feyenoord

Players

Current roster

Notable players

Individual awards

All-DBL Team
Patrick Hilliman – 2010
Arūnas Mikalauskas – 2021
DBL Coach of the Year
Erik Braal – 2006
DBL MVP Under 23
Arvin Slagter – 2006
DBL Rookie of the Year
Jeroen Slor – 2008

DBL Most Improved Player
Leon Williams – 2012
Yannick Franke – 2015
DBL All-Rookie Team
Yasalde Pas Costa – 2007
Yannick Franke – 2014
Nigel Onuoha – 2015

Club records
Bold denotes still active with team. As of 14 April 2021:

Trophies
NBB Cup
'''Winners (1): 1984–85
Runners-up (1): 2005–06

Season by season

Head coaches

References

Notes

External links
Official website 
Eurobasket.com profile

 
Basketball teams in the Netherlands
Basketball teams established in 1954
Dutch Basketball League teams
Sports clubs in Rotterdam